Symphonic metal is a cross-generic style designation for the symphonic subsets of heavy metal music subgenres. It is used to denote any metal band that makes use of symphonic or orchestral elements. The style features the heavy drums and guitars of metal with different elements of orchestral classical music, such as symphonic instruments, choirs and sometimes a full orchestra, or just keyboard orchestration.

Symphonic metal bands can feature classically trained vocalists, in which case they can be attributed nicknames such as opera metal or operatic metal. Perhaps the most pioneering and prominent examples of symphonic metal bands are Swedish band Therion, Finnish band Nightwish, Italian band Rhapsody of Fire and Dutch bands Epica, Within Temptation and The Gathering. All six bands place a large focus on elements prevalent in film scores in addition to the more basic classical components utilized more widely in the genre.

Musical characteristics

The metal subgenres most typically featuring a subset of symphonic bands are gothic metal, power metal, black metal, death metal and classic heavy metal. As with many other metal bands, those adopting a symphonic style may feature influences from several metal subgenres.

Music workstation keyboards and orchestras are often a key feature of the style, distinguishing symphonic from non-symphonic bands within the same metal subgenre. Other instruments, including guitars, bass and drums, may at times play relatively simple parts in contrast to the complex and nuanced keyboard and/or orchestral parts. Bands that do not use live orchestral instrumentation on their recordings or when playing live typically utilize factory presets on workstation keyboards (i. e., strings, choirs, pianos, pipe organs, etc.) to conjure up a "pseudo-orchestral" sound, where parts are played idiomatically according to keyboard technique. This is particularly characteristic of lesser-known bands on tighter budgets. Some symphonic metal bands abstain from using keyboards entirely, preferring to use orchestral backing tracks pre-recorded by a live symphony orchestra and/or choir during an album session, or recorded using virtual software instruments in a sequencer. This is particularly characteristic of bands that feature deeper and more complex arrangements which could be more difficult for one or two keyboardists to reproduce faithfully in a live performance.

It is more difficult to generalize about the role of the classic metal instruments (guitars, bass and drums), as they vary depending on the metal subgenre to which the symphonic band mostly associates. With varying frequency, symphonic bands may employ these instruments (as well as the lead vocals) to play more simple, catchy melodies than non-symphonic bands, which arguably make the symphonic metal style one of the most accessible in metal.

Songs are often highly atmospheric, though more upbeat than those of many non-symphonic metal bands; songs with morbid themes routinely feature prominent major-key fanfares. Particularly central to creating mood and atmosphere is the choice of keyboard timbre.

Lyrics cover a broad range of topics. As with two of its often overlapping elements, power metal and opera (including symphonic progressive rock), fantasy and mythological themes are common. Concept albums styled after operas or epic poems are not uncommon.

Bands in this genre may often feature a female lead vocalist, usually a soprano. Male vocalists (baritone or bass-baritone), are also common in gothic metal. Growling, death-metal-style vocals are not unknown but tend to be used less frequently than in other metal subgenres (a notable exception being Mark Jansen in Epica). Backing vocals, often consisting of a choral ensemble or full choir, may be employed.

It is common for bands, particularly female-fronted bands, to feature operatic lead vocals. Such bands may be referred to as operatic symphonic metal and include the likes of Epica, Nightwish (Tarja Turunen, then Floor Jansen), Haggard, Therion, Operatika, Dremora, Dol Ammad, Visions of Atlantis, Aesma Daeva, and Almora, among countless others. The operatic style is not tied exclusively to symphonic metal, but may appear in avant-garde metal, progressive metal and gothic metal.

Origins and evolution
Among the first rock bands to use orchestral elements were Deep Purple, with Concerto for Group and Orchestra, a three-movement epic performed by the band at the Royal Albert Hall in London with the Royal Philharmonic Orchestra, the Moody Blues, with Days of Future Passed, and the Nice, with Five Bridges.  Black Sabbath followed suit with "Spiral Architect".  Other bands began to experiment with heavier songs with arrangements, such as Ma Ma Ma Belle by Electric Light Orchestra.  Symphonic metal can be traced to some early death metal and gothic metal bands who made use of symphonic elements in their music, notably Swiss extreme metal pioneers Celtic Frost, using French horn on their 1985 release To Mega Therion (which inspired the naming of symphonic metal pioneers Therion) and more prominent symphonic orchestra on their 1987 album Into the Pandemonium.

An early prototypical symphonic metal song was "Dies Irae" by American Christian thrash metal group Believer. Appearing on their 1990 album Sanity Obscure, it foreshadowed the operatic approach used by the bands Therion and Nightwish. According to Jeff Wagner in his book Mean Deviation, the song was a creative watershed in metal, and except for Mekong Delta, no other extreme metal band at the time had merged the genre with classical music so seamlessly.

 The band Therion were influential in forming the genre through their use of a live orchestra and classical compositional techniques; gradually these elements became a more important part of Therion's music than their death metal roots. Another key early influence was Finnish progressive metal band Waltari's album Yeah! Yeah! Die! Die! Death Metal Symphony in Deep C. In mid-1996 Rage released Lingua Mortis, the band's first collaboration with the Prague Symphony Orchestra.

Nightwish, Rhapsody of Fire and Within Temptation all released their first album in 1997. Within Temptation's sound was usually defined as gothic metal, being overall simpler than Nightwish's power metal, but both bands shared two frequent symphonic metal elements - powerful female lead vocals from Tarja Turunen and Sharon den Adel respectively, and the heavy use of classically influenced keyboard playing. Haggard, which started as a progressive death metal band, had released some demos and EPs in their early years in a simple death metal style, but in 1997 went a step forward. They chose to change their style and to turn it into a mix of classical music with real classical and medieval instruments such as, violin, viola, cello, flute, oboe, clarinet, crumhorn, keyboards and death metal, releasing their first symphonic metal studio album.

Many new symphonic bands appeared or came to wide attention in the early to mid 2000s, including Rain Fell Within, After Forever, Epica, Delain, Leaves' Eyes, Xandria, and Edenbridge, all featuring female vocals and the characteristic keyboards. Power metal, with its relatively upbeat fantasy themes and stylized keyboard sounds, tended to be an important influence on these groups.

The term "symphonic metal" has sometimes been applied to individual songs or albums by bands that belong primarily to the basic, non-symphonic style of their subgenre. However, it is worth noting that the term is sometimes used to describe stylistic elements increasingly present in a growing number of metal music subgenres.

The symphonic style in metal subgenres

The term "symphonic metal" is used to denote any metal band that makes use of symphonic or orchestral elements; "symphonic metal" then is not so much a subgenre but rather a cross-generic designation. A few bands simply refer to themselves as "symphonic metal", particularly Aesma Daeva, and the term is applied by some to generically ambiguous metal bands like Epica and post-2002 Nightwish. Following heavy metal's tradition of classifying its subgenres based on the differences among the musical structures in the electric, "metal" part of bands' sound, the label "symphonic" is usually added as a prefix preceding the subgenre to which a band mostly belongs. No "symphonic metal" band being simply symphonic, a subgenre definition could be attributable to any bands simply defining themselves as symphonic metal. Symphonic heavy metal and symphonic gothic metal bands are the main objects of such neglect of classification, originating the misperception of "symphonic metal" as a coherent and separated metal subgenre excluding symphonic black, -death, and -power metal bands.

Symphonic black metal

Symphonic black metal has similar components as melodic black metal, but uses keyboarding or instruments normally found in symphonic or classical music. It can also include black metal bands that make heavy usage of atmospheric keyboarding in the music, akin to symphonic metal or gothic metal. The symphonic aspects of this genre are normally integral parts of a band, and as such are commonly used throughout the whole duration of a song. The prototypical symphonic black metal bands are Dimmu Borgir, Cradle of Filth, Emperor and Carach Angren.

Symphonic power metal

Symphonic power metal refers to power metal bands that make extensive usage of keyboards, or instruments normally found in classical music, similar to symphonic metal. These additional elements are often used as key elements of the music when compared to regular power metal, contributing not only an extra layer to the music, but a greater variety of sound. Bands in this genre often feature clean vocals, with some bands adding relatively small quantities of screams or growls.

The first prototypical symphonic power metal song was "Art of Life", a twenty-nine-minute song performed by Japanese heavy metal band X Japan in 1993. A defining role for the style's development was played by Italian band Rhapsody of Fire since their groundbreaking 1997 debut Legendary Tales, first with a baroque approach influenced by Vivaldi and Paganini, and subsequently with a growing film-score oriented turn employing full orchestras and choirs. The influence of symphonic and operatic music are equally audible in cognate bands Luca Turilli's Rhapsody and Turilli / Lione Rhapsody. Rhapsody's contributions to symphonic metal are best exemplified by short songs like "Emerald Sword", "Dawn of Victory" and "Lamento Eroico", and long suites such as "Gargoyles, Angels of Darkness", "The Mystic Prophecy of the Demonknight" and "Erian's Mystical Rhymes". Finnish band Nightwish, who debuted the same year, also performed symphonic power metal, their style being well exemplified by songs like "Wishmaster" from the album Wishmaster and the rest of their discography up until year 2000. Since the album Century Child they gradually decreased their power metal influences, with songs like "Ghost Love Score" from the album Once, "The Poet and the Pendulum" from the album Dark Passion Play and "The Greatest Show on Earth" from the album Endless Forms Most Beautiful as the best examples of their new course making an ever more extensive use of orchestral elements.

German band Blind Guardian also introduced some symphonic elements in the album Nightfall in Middle-Earth, although it wasn't until 2002 with A Night at the Opera when they established their symphonic power metal style, mainly with the song "And Then There Was Silence". They gradually began to compose more and more symphonic songs such as "Sacred Worlds" and "Wheel of Time", both featured in the album At the Edge of Time, and "The Ninth Wave", "At the Edge of Time", "The Throne" and "Grand Parade" from their latest album Beyond the Red Mirror. They made as well orchestral versions of previously released songs like "The Lord of the Rings" and "Theatre of Pain", both included in the compilation album The Forgotten Tales. Blind Guardian went deeper into symphonic music with the album Legacy of the Dark Lands, a fully orchestral album composed by singer Hansi Kürsch and guitarist André Olbrich that kept the band's spirit but was credited to the "Blind Guardian Twilight Orchestra", as Hansi was the only member of the band to perform on the album.

Symphonic gothic metal

One of the first gothic metal bands to release a full album featuring "Beauty and the Beast" vocals, where death metal vocals are contrasted with clean female vocals, was the Norwegian Theatre of Tragedy in 1995. From then on after the departure of lead singer, Liv Kristine, in 2003, she and her future husband, Alexander Krull went on to form the symphonic metal band, Leaves' Eyes. The band is one of the pioneers of the "Beauty and the Beast" vocal style scene. Other bands, such as the Dutch Within Temptation in 1996, expanded on this approach. A debut album Enter was unveiled in the following year, followed shortly by an EP The Dance. Both releases made use of the beauty and beast approach delivered by vocalists Sharon den Adel and Robert Westerholt. Their second full-length Mother Earth was released in 2000 and dispensed entirely with the death metal vocals, instead "relying solely on den Adel's majestic vocal ability", apart from one b-side track that did not make the final album release. The album was a commercial success with their lead single "Ice Queen" topping the charts in Belgium and their native Netherlands. Their third album The Silent Force arrived in 2004 as an "ambitious project featuring a full orchestra and 80-voice choir accompanying the band". The result was another commercial success across Europe and introduced "the world of heavy guitars and female vocals" to "a mainstream audience".

Within Temptation's brand of gothic metal combines "the guitar-driven force of hard rock with the sweep and grandeur of symphonic music". The critic Chad Bowar of About.com describes their style as "the optimum balance" between "the melody and hooks of mainstream rock, the depth and complexity of classical music and the dark edge of gothic metal". The commercial success of Within Temptation has since resulted in the emergence of a large number of other female-fronted gothic metal bands, particularly in the Netherlands. A typical example of their most symphonic sound can be heard in the songs "Jillian (I'd give my Heart)" and "Our Solemn Hour".

Another Dutch band in the symphonic gothic metal strain is After Forever. Their debut album Prison of Desire in 2000 was "a courageous, albeit flawed first study into an admittedly daunting undertaking: to wed heavy metal with progressive rock arrangements and classical music orchestration - then top it all off with equal parts gruesome cookie-monster vocals and a fully qualified opera singer". Founding member, guitarist and vocalist Mark Jansen departed After Forever only a few months after the release of their second album Decipher. Jansen would go on to form Epica, another Dutch band that performs a blend of gothic and symphonic metal. A debut album The Phantom Agony emerged in 2003 with music that combines Jansen's death grunts with the "angelic tones of a classically trained soprano, Simone Simons, over a lush foundation of symphonic power metal". The music of Epica has been described as combination of "a dark, haunting gothic atmosphere with bombastic and symphonic music". Like Within Temptation and After Forever, Epica has been known to make use of an orchestra. Their 2007 album The Divine Conspiracy was a chart success in their home country.

This blend of symphonic and gothic metal has also been arrived at from the opposite direction. The band Nightwish from Finland began as a symphonic power metal act and introduced gothic elements on their 2004 album Once, particularly on the single "Nemo". They continued to mix their style of "bombastic, symphonic and cinematic" metal with a gothic atmosphere on their next album Dark Passion Play in 2007. The Swedish group Therion also introduced gothic elements to their brand of symphonic metal on their 2007 album Gothic Kabbalah.

Symphonic death metal 

Bands described as symphonic death metal include Ex Deo, Septicflesh, Children of Bodom, MaYaN, and Fleshgod Apocalypse. Haggard's 2000 album, Awaking the Centuries, has been described as death metal–styled symphonic metal. Make Them Suffer is a band that mixes deathcore with symphonic/classical elements in their earlier material. Other bands that have mixed deathcore with symphonic metal include Winds of Plague, Shadow of Intent, Lorna Shore (in their more recent material) and Betraying the Martyrs, the latter being known to "temper the punishing brutality of deathcore with melodic flourishes pulled from symphonic and progressive metal, giving it a theatricality that feels distinctly European."

See also

 Avant-garde metal
 List of symphonic metal bands
 Melodic death metal
 Neoclassical metal
 Neoclassical dark wave
 Power metal
 Progressive metal

References

External links 
 

 
Fusion music genres
Heavy metal genres
Norwegian styles of music